The wild man, wild man of the woods, or woodwose/wodewose is a mythical figure and motif that appears in the art and literature of medieval Europe, comparable to the satyr or faun type in classical mythology and to Silvanus, the Roman god of the woodlands.

The defining characteristic of the figure is its "wildness"; from the 12th century, it was consistently depicted as being covered with hair. Images of wild men appear in the carved and painted roof bosses where intersecting ogee vaults meet in Canterbury Cathedral, in positions where one is also likely to encounter the vegetal Green Man. The image of the wild man survived to appear as supporter for heraldic coats-of-arms, especially in Germany, well into the 16th century. Renaissance engravers in Germany and Italy were particularly fond of wild men, wild women, and wild families, with examples from Martin Schongauer (died 1491) and Albrecht Dürer (1471–1528) among others.

Terminology

The normal Middle English term, also used to the present day, was woodwose or wodewose (also spelled woodehouse, wudwas etc., understood perhaps as variously singular or plural).  Wodwos occurs in  Sir Gawain and the Green Knight (c. 1390).  The Middle English word is first attested for the 1340s, in references to the wild man popular at the time in decorative art, as in a Latin description of an tapestry of the Great Wardrobe of Edward III, but as a surname it is found as early as 1251, of one Robert de Wudewuse. In reference to an actual legendary or mythological creature, the term is found during the 1380s, in Wycliffe's Bible, translating   (LXX δαιμόνια, Latin pilosi meaning "hairy") in Isaiah 13:21 The occurrences in Sir Gawain and the Green Knight date to soon after Wycliffe's Bible, to c. 1390.

The first element is usually explained as from  "wood, forest". The second element is less clear. It has been identified as a hypothetical noun *wāsa "being", from the verb wesan, wosan "to be, to be alive". It might alternatively mean a forlorn or abandoned person, cognate with German Waise and Dutch wees which both mean "orphan".

Some of the local names suggest associations with characters from ancient mythology. Common in Lombardy and the Italian-speaking parts of the Alps are the terms salvan and salvang,  which derive from the Latin Silvanus, the name of the Roman tutelary god of gardens and the countryside. Similarly, folklore in Tyrol and German-speaking Switzerland into the 20th century included a wild woman known as Fange or Fanke, which derives from the Latin fauna, the feminine form of faun. Medieval German sources give as names for the wild woman lamia and holzmoia (or some variation); the former clearly refers to the Greek wilderness demon Lamia while the latter derives ultimately from Maia, a Greco-Roman earth and fertility goddess who is identified elsewhere with Fauna and who exerted a wide influence on medieval wild-man lore.
Slavic has leshy "forest man".

Various languages and traditions include names suggesting affinities with Orcus, a Roman and Italic god of death. The French ogre has the same derivation, as do modern literary orcs. Importantly, Orcus is associated with Maia in a dance celebrated late enough to be condemned in a 9th- or 10th-century Spanish penitential.

The term was usually replaced in literature of the Early Modern English period by classically derived equivalents, or "wild man", but it survives in the form of the surname Wodehouse or Woodhouse (see Wodehouse family).

Origins

Figures similar to the European wild man occur worldwide from very early times. The earliest recorded example of the type is the character Enkidu of the ancient Mesopotamian Epic of Gilgamesh.

The description of Nebuchadnezzar II in the Book of Daniel (2nd century BC) greatly influenced the medieval European concepts. Daniel 4 depicts God humbling the Babylonian king for his boastfulness; stricken mad and ejected from human society, he grows hair on his body and lives like a beast. This image was popular in medieval depictions of Nebuchadnezzar. Similarly, late medieval legends of Saint John Chrysostom (died 407) describe the saint's asceticism as making him so isolated and feral that hunters who capture him cannot tell if he is man or beast.

The medieval wild-man concept also drew on lore about similar beings from the Classical world such as the Roman faun and Silvanus, and perhaps even Heracles. Several folk traditions about the wild man correspond with ancient practices and beliefs. Notably, peasants in the Grisons tried to capture the wild man by getting him drunk and tying him up in hopes that he would give them his wisdom in exchange for freedom. This suggests an association with an ancient tradition – recorded as early as Xenophon (d. 354 BC) and appearing in the works of Ovid, Pausanias, and Claudius Aelianus – in which shepherds caught a forest being, here termed Silenus or Faunus, in the same manner and for the same purpose.

Besides mythological influences, medieval wild man lore also drew on the learned writings of ancient historians, though likely to a lesser degree. These ancient wild men are naked and sometimes covered with hair, though importantly the texts generally localize them in some faraway land, distinguishing them from the medieval wild man who was thought to exist just at the boundaries of civilization. The first historian to describe such beings, Herodotus (c. 484 BC – c. 425 BC), places them in western Libya alongside the headless men with eyes in their chest and dog-faced creatures. After the appearance of the former Persian court physician Ctesias's book Indika (concerning India), which recorded Persian beliefs about the subcontinent, and the conquests of Alexander the Great, India became the primary home of fantastic creatures in the Western imagination, and wild men were frequently described as living there. Megasthenes, Seleucus I Nicator's ambassador to Chandragupta Maurya, wrote of two kinds of men to be found in India whom he explicitly describes as wild: first, a creature brought to court whose toes faced backwards; second, a tribe of forest people who had no mouths and who sustained themselves with smells. Both Quintus Curtius Rufus and Arrian refer to Alexander himself meeting with a tribe of fish-eating savages while on his Indian campaign.

Distorted accounts of apes may have contributed to both the ancient and medieval conception of the wild man. In his Natural History Pliny the Elder describes a race of silvestres, wild creatures in India who had humanoid bodies but a coat of fur, fangs, and no capacity to speak – a description that fits gibbons indigenous to the area. The ancient Carthaginian explorer Hanno the Navigator (fl. 500 BC) reported an encounter with a tribe of savage men and hairy women in what may have been Sierra Leone; their interpreters called them "Gorillae," a story which much later originated the name of the gorilla species and could indeed have related to a great ape. Similarly, the Greek historian Agatharchides describes what may have been chimpanzees as tribes of agile, promiscuous "seed-eaters" and "wood-eaters" living in Ethiopia.

Medieval representations

Some of the earliest evidence for the wild-man tradition appears in the above-mentioned 9th- or 10th-century Spanish penitential. This book describes a dance in which participants donned the guise of the figures Orcus, Maia, and Pela, and ascribes a minor penance for those who participate with what was apparently a resurgence of an older pagan custom. The identity of Pela is unknown, but the earth goddess Maia appears as the wild woman (Holz-maia in the later German glossaries), and names related to Orcus were associated with the wild man through the Middle Ages, indicating that this dance was an early version of the wild-man festivities celebrated through the Middle Ages and surviving in parts of Europe through modern times.

As the name implies, the main characteristic of the wild man is his wildness. Civilized people regarded wild men as beings of the wilderness, the antithesis of civilization.
Other characteristics developed or transmuted in different contexts. From the earliest times, sources associated wild men with hairiness; by the 12th century they were almost invariably described as having a coat of hair covering their entire bodies except for their hands, feet, faces above their long beards, and the breasts and chins of the females.  

In art the hair more often covers the same areas that a chemise or dress would, except for the female's breasts; male knees are also often hairless.  As with the feather tights of angels, this is probably influenced by the costumes of popular drama.  The female depiction also follows Mary Magdalene's hair suit in art; in medieval legend this miraculously appeared when she retreated to the desert after Christ's death, and her clothes fell apart.

Romanesque Europe
A wild man is described in the book Konungs skuggsjá (Speculum Regale or "the King's Mirror"), written in Norway about 1250:

It once happened in that country (and this seems indeed strange) that a living creature was caught in the forest as to which no one could say definitely whether it was a man or some other animal; for no one could get a word from it or be sure that it understood human speech. It had the human shape, however, in every detail, both as to hands and face and feet; but the entire body was covered with hair as the beasts are, and down the back it had a long coarse mane like that of a horse, which fell to both sides and trailed along the ground when the creature stooped in walking.

A "black and hairy" forest-dwelling outcast is mentioned in the tale of Renaud de Montauban, written in the late 12th century.

Celtic mythology
The 9th-century Irish tale Buile Shuibhne (The Madness of Sweeney) describes how Shuibhne or Sweeney, the pagan king of the Dál nAraidi in Ulster, assaults the Christian bishop Ronan Finn and is cursed with madness as a result. He begins to grow feathers and talons as the curse runs its full course, flies like a bird, and spends many years travelling naked through the woods, composing verses among other madmen. In order to be forgiven by God, King Suibhne composes a beautiful poem of praise to God before he dies.  There are further poems and stories recounting the life and madness of King Suibhne. The Welsh told a similar story about Myrddin Wyllt, the origin of the Merlin of later romance. In these stories, Myrddin is a warrior in the service of King Gwenddoleu ap Ceidio at the time of the Battle of Arfderydd. When his lord is killed at the battle, Myrddin travels to the Caledonian Forest in a fit of madness which endows him with the ability to compose prophetic poetry; a number of later prophetic poems are attributed to him. The Life of Saint Kentigern includes almost the same story, though here the madman of Arfderydd is instead named Lailoken, which may be the original name. The fragmentary 16th-century Breton text An Dialog Etre Arzur Roe D'an Bretounet Ha Guynglaff (Dialog Between Arthur and Guynglaff) tells of a meeting between King Arthur and the wild man Guynglaff, who predicts events which will occur as late as the 16th century.

Geoffrey of Monmouth recounts the Myrddin Wyllt legend in his Latin Vita Merlini of about 1150, though here the figure has been renamed "Merlin". According to Geoffrey, after Merlin witnessed the horrors of the battle:

...a strange madness came upon him. He crept away and fled to the woods, unwilling that any should see his going. Into the forest he went, glad to lie hidden beneath the ash trees. He watched the wild creatures grazing on the pasture of the glades. Sometimes he would follow them, sometimes pass them in his course. He made use of the roots of plants and of grasses, of fruit from trees and of the blackberries in the thicket. He became a Man of the Woods, as if dedicated to the woods. So for a whole summer he stayed hidden in the woods, discovered by none, forgetful of himself and of his own, lurking like a wild thing.

Slavic mythology

Wild (divi) people are the characters of the Slavic folk demonology, mythical forest creatures. Names go back to two related Slavic roots *dik- and *div-, combining the meaning of "wild" and "amazing, strange".

In the East Slavic sources referred: Saratov  – leshy; a short man with a big beard and tail; Ukrainian lisovi lyudi – old men with overgrown hair who give silver to those who rub their nose; Kostroma dikiy chort; Vyatka dikonkiy unclean spirit, sending paralysis; Ukrainian lihiy div – marsh spirit, sending fever; Ukrainian Carpathian dika baba – an attractive woman in seven-league boots, sacrifices children and drinks their blood, seduces men. There are similarities between the East Slavic reports about wild people and book legends about diviy peoples (unusual people from the medieval novel "Alexandria") and mythical representations of miraculous peoples. For example, Russians from Ural believe that divnye lyudi are short, beautiful, have a pleasant voice, live in caves in the mountains, can predict the future; among the Belarusians of Vawkavysk uyezd, the dzikie lyudzi – one-eyed cannibals living overseas, also drink lamb blood; among the Belarusians of Sokółka uyezd, the overseas dzikij narod have grown wool, they have a long tail and ears like an ox; they do not speak, but only squeal.

Late Medieval
King Charles VI of France and five of his courtiers were dressed as wild men and chained together for a masquerade at the tragic Bal des Sauvages which occurred in Paris at the Hôtel Saint-Pol, 28 January 1393. They were "in costumes of linen cloth sewn onto their bodies and soaked in resinous wax or pitch to hold a covering of frazzled hemp, so that they appeared shaggy & hairy from head to foot". In the midst of the festivities, a stray spark from a torch set their flammable costumes ablaze, burning several courtiers to death; the king's own life was saved through quick action by his aunt, Joann, who covered him with her dress.

A knight held a series of jousts with an allegoric meaning in which the conquest of the wild lady symbolized the feats the knight must do to merit a lady.

Some early sets of playing cards have a suite of Wild Men, including a pack engraved by the Master of the Playing Cards (active in the Rhineland c. 1430-1450), some of the earliest European engravings. A set of four miniatures on the estates of society by Jean Bourdichon of about 1500 includes a wild family, along with "poor", "artisan" and "rich" ones.

Martin Schongauer's Wild Men

Martin Schongauer depicted wild people several times, including on four heraldic shield engravings of the 1480s which depict wild men holding the coat of arms of the print's patrons. Each image is confined within an approximately 78 mm circular composition which is not new to Schongauer's oeuvre. 

In Wild Man Holding a Shield with a Hare and a Shield with a Moor's Head, the wild man holds two parallel shields, which seem to project from the groin of the central figure. The wild man supports the weight of the shields on two cliffs. The hair on the apex of the wild man's head is adorned with twigs which project outward; as if to make a halo. The wild man does not look directly at the viewer; in fact, he looks down somberly toward the bottom right region of his circular frame. His somber look is reminiscent of that an animal trapped in a zoo as if to suggest that he is upset to have been tamed. 

There is a stark contrast between the first print and Shield with a Greyhound, held by a Wild Man as this figure stands much more confidently. Holding a bludgeon, he looks past the shield and off into the distance while wearing a crown of vines.  In Schongauer's third print, Shield with Stag Held by Wild Man, the figure grasps his bludgeon like a walking stick and steps in the same direction as the stag. He too wears a crown of vines, which trail behind into the wind toward a jagged mountaintop. 

In his fourth print, Wild Woman Holding a Shield with a Lion's Head, Schongauer depicts a different kind of scene. This scene is more intimate. The image depicts a wild woman sitting on a stump with her suckling offspring at her breast. While the woman's body is covered in hair her face is left bare. She also wears a crown of vines. Then, compared to the other wild men, the wild woman is noticeably disproportionate. 

Finally, each print is visually strong enough to stand alone as individual scenes, but when lined up it seems as if they were stamped out of a continuous scene with a circular die.

Early modern representations

The wild man was used as a symbol of mining in late medieval and Renaissance Germany. It appears in this context in the coats of arms of Naila and of Wildemann. The town of Wildemann in the Upper Harz was founded during 1529 by miners who, according to legend, met a wild man and wife when they ventured into the wilds of the Harz mountain range.

Petrus Gonsalvus (born 1537) was referred to by Ulisse Aldrovandi as "the man of the woods" due to his condition, hypertrichosis. Some of his children were also afflicted. It is believed that his marriage to the lady Catherine inspired the fairy tale Beauty and the Beast.

In Shakespeare's The Winter's Tale (1611), the dance of twelve "Satyrs" at the rustic sheep-shearing (IV.iv), prepared by a servant's account:

The account conflates wild men and satyrs. Shakespeare may have been inspired by the episode of Ben Jonson's masque Oberon, the Faery Prince (performed 1 January 1611), where the satyrs have "tawnie wrists" and "shaggy thighs"; they "run leaping and making antique action."

Modern literary representations

The term wood-woses or simply Woses is used by J. R. R. Tolkien to describe a fictional race of wild men, the Drúedain, in his books on Middle-earth. According to Tolkien's legendarium, other men, including the Rohirrim, mistook the Drúedain for goblins or other wood-creatures and referred to them as Púkel-men (Goblin-men). He allows the fictional possibility that his Drúedain were the "actual" origin of the wild men of later traditional folklore. 

British poet Ted Hughes used the form wodwo as the title of a poem and a 1967 volume of his collected works.

The fictional character Tarzan from Edgar Rice Burroughs' 1912 novel Tarzan of the Apes has been described as a modern version of the wild man archetype.

Modern documented representations

A documented feral child was Ng Chhaidy living naked in the jungle of India; her hair and fingernails grew for 38 years until she had become a "wild woman".

Interpretation

The Wild Man has been discussed in Freudian terms as representative of the "potentialities lurking in the heart of every individual, whether primitive or civilized, as his possible incapacity to come to terms with his socially provided world."

Heraldry and art

Late Medieval and Renaissance

Heraldry

See also

 Am Fear Liath Mòr
 Basajaun
 Bigfoot
 Bugbear
 Caveman
 Enkidu
 Green Man
 Hamadryad
 Human zoo
 Krampus
 Leshy
 Moss people
 Nittaewo
 Noble savage
 Straw bear
 Valentine and Orson
 Yeren
 Yeti

References

 
 Bartra, Roger, Wild Men in the Looking Glass: The Mythic Origins of the European Otherness, Ann Arbor, The University of Michigan Press, 1994.
 Bartra, Roger, The Artificial Savage: Modern Myths of the Wild Man, Ann Arbor, The University of Michigan Press, 1997.
 Richard Bernheimer, Wild men in the Middle Ages, Cambridge : Harvard University Press, 1952; New York : Octagon books, 1979, 
 Rachel Bromwich (2006). Trioedd Ynys Prydein: The Triads of the Island of Britain. University Of Wales Press. .
 Timothy Husband, The wild man : medieval myth and symbolism, Catalogue of an exhibition held at the Cloisters, Metropolitan Museum of Art, 1980, 
 Rebecca Martin, Wild Men and Moors in the Castle of Love: The Castle-Siege Tapestries in Nuremberg, Vienna, and Boston,  Thesis (Ph.D.), Chapel Hill/N. C., 1983
 Norris J. Lacy (1991). The New Arthurian Encyclopedia. New York: Garland. .
 O. V. Belova, Slavic antiquity. Ethnolinguistic dictionary by Ed. by N. I. Tolstoi; The Institute for Slavic Studies of the Russian Academy of Sciences. Moscow: Mezhdunarodnye Otnosheniia, 1999. 
 Yamamoto, Dorothy (2000). The Boundaries of the Human in Medieval English Literature. Oxford.

Further reading
 Bergholm, Anna Aune Alexandra. "King, Poet, Seer: Aspects of the Celtic Wild Man Legend in Medieval Literature". In: FF Network. 2013; Vol. 43. pp. 4-9.

External links

Celtic legendary creatures
English legendary creatures
French legendary creatures
Italian legendary creatures
Germanic legendary creatures
Slavic legendary creatures
Heraldic beasts
Medieval legends
Iconography
Slovene mythology
Mythic humanoids